Richard H. Stockbridge is a Distinguished Professor of Mathematics at the University of Wisconsin-Milwaukee.  His contributions to research primarily involve stochastic control theory, optimal stopping and mathematical finance.  Most notably, alongside Professors Thomas G. Kurtz, Kurt Helmes, and Chao Zhu, he developed the methodology of using linear programming to solve stochastic control problems.

Education 
Stockbridge obtained his Ph.D. from the University of Wisconsin-Madison under the supervision of Thomas G. Kurtz with a dissertation entitled "Time-Average Control of Martingale Problems".  He also holds a master's degree in mathematics from the University of Wisconsin-Madison and attended St. Lawrence University in Canton, New York, for his baccalaureate studies.

Academic career 
Following the awarding of his Ph.D., Stockbridge served as an assistant professor in the Department of Mathematics and Statistics at Case Western Reserve University from 1987 to 1988.  He then took an assistant professor position at the University of Kentucky from 1988 to 1993, leading to an associate professorship which he held until 2000.  Later, Stockbridge began working at the University of Wisconsin-Milwaukee and became a full professor in 2002.  In 2018, he was awarded the title of "distinguished professor" by the University of Wisconsin Milwaukee Distinguished Faculty Committee.

Stockbridge has also held various visiting positions, including:
 Visiting Scholar, Heriot Watt University, School of Mathematical and Computer Science, Edinburgh, Scotland, March–August 2016
 Sabbaticant Professor, University of Botswana, Department of Mathematics, July 2008 – January 2009
 Visiting Fellow, Bath University, Department of Mathematical Sciences, Bath, England, January–July 1997
 Visiting Assistant Professor, University of Kentucky, Department of Mathematics, Lexington, Kentucky, 1988–89

Research 
Professor Stockbridge's research is focused on developing linear programming techniques in stochastic control.  These techniques give an alternative formulation to the traditional dynamic programming framework used in stochastic control problems and have been demonstrated in examples including control of the running maximum of a diffusion, optimal stopping problems, and regime-switching diffusions.

Through the completion of his Ph.D. dissertation, Stockbridge examined the relationship between long-term average stochastic control problems and linear programs spanning the space of stationary distributions for that controlled process, ultimately concluding their equivalence. This dissertation served as a basis for significant work in the field.

Following his graduate studies, Stockbridge helped expand the applications of this equivalence between linear programming and stochastic control to include discounted, first-exit and finite horizon problems.

Publications 
Notable publications by Richard Stockbridge include:

References 

Living people
American mathematicians
University of Wisconsin–Milwaukee faculty
Year of birth missing (living people)